The Universiteiten van Nederland (UNL) is, since November 2021, the new name of the Vereniging van Universiteiten (VSNU; English: Association of Universities in the Netherlands). The UNL is a trade group of ten government-funded universities, three special universities, and the Open University of the Netherlands.

Organization
The UNL acts as a consultative body for its members. It is also the mouthpiece for universities in the national media. It represents university education and research in the Cabinet of the Netherlands, the House of Representatives, and the European Union, and in price negotiations with academic publishers such as Elsevier, Springer, and the Royal Society of Chemistry (UK). It is the employers' organization of Dutch universities.

The association was located in Utrecht until 2005. The institutions that are important for university policy, however, are often headquartered in The Hague. To optimize the interests of the universities towards these institutions, the UNL moved to The Hague in March 2005.

Almost every country in the world has a university association that brings together common interests. There is also an umbrella of European university associations (the European University Association) and of universities worldwide (the International Association of Universities).

Members 
The association consists of the following 14 institutions:
 Erasmus Universiteit Rotterdam
 Open Universiteit Nederland
 Radboud Universiteit Nijmegen 
 Rijksuniversiteit Groningen
 Technische Universiteit Delft
 Technische Universiteit Eindhoven
 Universiteit van Amsterdam
 Universiteit Leiden
 Universiteit Maastricht
 Universiteit van Tilburg 
 Universiteit Twente
 Universiteit Utrecht
 Vrije Universiteit Amsterdam
 Wageningen Universiteit

See also
 Open access in the Netherlands
  (Flemish university council in Belgium)
 List of employer associations

References

This article incorporates information from the Dutch Wikipedia.

External links 
 Official site
 WorldCat. Vereniging van Samenwerkende Nederlandse Universiteiten

Educational organisations based in the Netherlands
Universities in the Netherlands
College and university associations and consortia in Europe
Non-profit organisations based in the Netherlands
1985 establishments in the Netherlands
Organisations based in The Hague